Quincy Booker Black (born February 28, 1984), is a former American football linebacker for the Tampa Bay Buccaneers of the National Football League. He attended the University of New Mexico.

High school career
Black attended Kenwood Academy High School in Chicago, where he played linebacker. Black accrued 224 tackles and 17 sacks over his high-school career, and was a three-year letterman in basketball.

College and pro career
In 2003, Black attended Harper College (Junior college), near Chicago, where he tallied 88 tackles, 28 TFL, and 16.5 sacks before he decided to transfer to University of New Mexico.

In 2004, Black started on special teams for all 12 games for the Lobo football team.  He gained 18 tackles, and caused a fumble in a game against Colorado State.

In 2005, Black started his 10 games and was the second-leading QB rusher. He also recorded his first INT.

In 2006, Black was predicted by Mel Kiper Jr., a celebrated NFL Draft analyst, as one of the top senior linebacker prospects in the country. He led the Mountain West Conference with 94 tackles, had an impressive 42-inch vertical leap on Pro Day, and solidified his position in the NFL Draft as a mid-round prospect.

In 2007, Black was drafted by Tampa Bay in the third round.

For the 2009-2010 NFL season, Black was slated to start at the strong side linebacker position in the new era of Buccaneers defense.

On November 13, 2012, Black was placed on injured reserve with a neck injury, and on March 14, 2013, the Tampa Bay Buccaneers announced on their official Facebook page that Black was being released due to a failed physical.

College statistics
Defensive Stats

References

1984 births
Living people
Tampa Bay Buccaneers players
American football linebackers
New Mexico Lobos football players
Players of American football from Chicago
Harper Hawks football players